Threose nucleic acid (TNA) is an artificial genetic polymer in which the natural five-carbon ribose sugar found in RNA has been replaced by an unnatural four-carbon threose sugar. Invented by Albert Eschenmoser as part of his quest to explore the chemical etiology of RNA, TNA has become an important synthetic genetic polymer (XNA) due to its ability to efficiently base pair with complementary sequences of DNA and RNA. However, unlike DNA and RNA, TNA is completely refractory to nuclease digestion, making it a promising nucleic acid analog for therapeutic and diagnostic applications. 

TNA oligonucleotides were first constructed by automated solid-phase synthesis using phosphoramidite chemistry. Methods for chemically synthesized TNA monomers (phosphoramidites and nucleoside triphosphates) have been heavily optimized to support synthetic biology projects aimed at advancing TNA research. More recently, polymerase engineering efforts have identified TNA polymerases that can copy genetic information back and forth between DNA and TNA. TNA replication occurs through a process that mimics RNA replication. In these systems, TNA is reverse transcribed into DNA, the DNA is amplified by the polymerase chain reaction, and then forward transcribed back into TNA.

The availability of TNA polymerases have enabled the in vitro selection of biologically stable TNA aptamers to both small molecule and protein targets. Such experiments demonstrate that the properties of heredity and evolution are not limited to the natural genetic polymers of DNA and RNA. The high biological stability of TNA relative to other nucleic acid systems that are capable of undergoing Darwinian evolution, suggests that TNA is a strong candidate for the development of next-generation therapeutic aptamers.

The mechanism of TNA synthesis by a laboratory evolved TNA polymerase has been studied using X-ray crystallography to capture the five major steps of nucleotide addition. These structures demonstrate imperfect recognition of the incoming TNA nucleotide triphosphate and support the need for further directed evolution experiments to create TNA polymerases with improved activity. The binary structure of a TNA reverse transcriptase has also been solved by X-ray crystallography, revealing the importance of structural plasticity as a possible mechanism for template recognition.

Pre DNA system 

John Chaput, a professor in the department of Pharmaceutical Sciences at the University of California, Irvine, has theorized that issues concerning the prebiotic synthesis of ribose sugars and the non-enzymatic replication of RNA may provide circumstantial evidence of an earlier genetic system more readily produced under primitive earth conditions. TNA could have been an early genetic system and a precursor to RNA. TNA is simpler than RNA and can be synthesized from a single starting material. TNA is able to transfer back and forth information with RNA and with strands of itself that are complementary to the RNA. TNA has been shown to fold into tertiary structures with discrete ligand-binding properties.

Commercial applications 
Although TNA research is still in its infancy, practical applications are already apparent. Its ability to undergo Darwinian evolution, coupled with its nuclease resistance, make TNA a promising candidate for the development of diagnostic and therapeutic applications that require high biological stability. This would include the evolution of TNA aptamers that can bind to specific small molecule and protein targets, as well as the development of TNA enzymes (threozymes) that can catalyze a chemical reaction. In addition, TNA is a promising candidate for RNA therapeutics that involve gene silencing technology. For example, TNA has been evaluated in a model system for antisense technology.

See also 
Abiogenesis
Glycol nucleic acid
Oligonucleotide synthesis
Peptide nucleic acid
Synthetic biology
Xeno nucleic acid
Xenobiology

References

Further reading 

 
     This works is describes in:

External links 
 Was simple TNA the first nucleic acid on Earth to carry a genetic code?, New Scientist (behind paywall)
 ORIGIN OF LIFE: A Simpler Nucleic Acid, Leslie Orgel

Nucleic acids
Polymers